Mikhail Feofanovich Potapov (23 January 1921 - 8 July 1943) was a Soviet Red Army artillery captain and commander of an anti-tank artillery battery from the 1188th Anti-Tank Artillery Regiment of the 13th Anti-Tank Artillery Brigade, 2nd Tank Army. Potapov's battery destroyed ten German tanks near the Ponyri railway station at the Battle of Kursk.

Captain Potapov was killed during the battle on 8 July 1943. He was twenty-two years old and had been in the Red Army since 1938.

He had served in the artillery as an officer since graduating from the Moscow Artillery School in 1940 and had received the Order of the Red Banner and other decorations during his war service.

He was posthumously named a Hero of the Soviet Union and awarded the Gold Star and Order of Lenin on 7 August 1943.

References

1921 births
1943 deaths
People from Dubovsky District, Rostov Oblast
Heroes of the Soviet Union
Recipients of the Order of Lenin
Recipients of the Order of the Red Banner
Russian people of World War II
Soviet military personnel killed in World War II
Recipients of the Medal "For Courage" (Russia)